Aba is a 2008 Sinhalese film directed by Jackson Anthony and co-produced by Justin Belagamage and Rajindra Jayasinghe for Chandrakini Creations. The title  is derived from Pandu Aba, another name for the title character. Anthony’s son, Sajitha Anthony, portrays Pandukabhaya. The film also features Malini Fonseka, Ravindra Randeniya, Sriyantha Mendis, Sabeetha Perera and many other popular actors.

It was released in Sri Lanka on 8 August 2008. Plans were made to screen the film in several other countries, including China, Italy and Australia.

Plot
Story based on the historical legend of King Pandukabhaya which is set in Sri Lanka more than 2,400 years ago.

Cast 
 Sajitha Anthony as Aba aka Pandukabhaya
 Ravindra Randeniya as Pandula
 Malini Fonseka as Buddhakachchana - won Sarasaviya Best Supporting Actress Award
 Sabeetha Perera as Unmaada Chitra
 Senaka Titus Anthony as Senda
 Kanchana Kodituwakku as Deega Gamini
 Saumya Liyanage as Habaraa
 Dulani Anuradha (Introducing) as Gumbakabutha - won Sarasaviya Best Actress Award
 Sriyantha Mendis as Parumukhaya
 Bimal Jayakody as Chittaraja
 Neil Alles as King Panduvasudeva
 Lucien Bulathsinhala as Abhaya
 Madhumadhawa Aravinda as Ginikhandashiva
 Kasun Chamara as Chandra
 Wasantha Dukgannarala as Maha Berana
 Priyankara Rathnayake as Yakchanda
 D.B. Gangodathenna as Astrologer

Awards and nominations
The film won numerous awards in different film festivals.

32nd Sarasaviya Awards

|-
|| 2008 ||| Aba || Most Popular Film || 
|-
|| 2008 ||| Aba || Best Actress by Dulani Anuradha || 
|-
|| 2008 ||| Aba || Best Supporting Actress by Malani Fonseka || 
|-
|| 2008 ||| Aba || Best Cinematographer by Suminda Weerasinghe || 
|-
|| 2008 ||| Aba || Best Music Direction by Nadeeka Guruge || 
|-
|| 2008 ||| Aba || Best Sound Effects by Klainga Gihan Perera || 
|-
|| 2008 ||| Aba || Best Lyricist by Sunil Ariyaratne || 
|-
|| 2008 ||| Aba || Merit Award by Senaka Titus || 
|-
|| 2008 ||| Aba || Merit Award by Sajitha Anthony || 
|-
|| 2008 ||| Aba || Merit Award by Udeni Subodi Kumara || 
|-
|| 2008 ||| Aba || Merit Award by Sri Kariyawasam || 
|-
|| 2008 ||| Aba || Merit Award by Nalin Kasmira ||

See also
 List of Asian historical drama films

References

External links
 

2008 films
2000s Sinhala-language films
Films set in the Anuradhapura period
Sri Lankan historical films
2000s historical films